Jai Opetaia (born 30 June 1995) is an Australian professional boxer who has held the IBF and The Ring world cruiserweight titles since July 2022. As an amateur he won a bronze medal at the 2012 Youth World Championships and represented Australia at the 2012 Olympics and 2014 Commonwealth Games. As of February 2023, Opetaia is ranked the world's best active cruiserweight by The Ring magazine, and the Transnational Boxing Rankings Board, second by BoxRec, and third best by ESPN.

Personal life 

Opetaia was born in Sydney, New South Wales and is of Samoan and European Australian heritage. He is related to Australian football player Tim Cahill and former rugby league player Ben Roberts.

Amateur career 
In Opetaia's amateur career, he won the Light Heavyweight title at the 2011 Junior World Championships then qualified for the 2012 Olympics as a Heavyweight at the age of 16, making him the youngest ever Australian Olympic boxer.

Opetaia won the Junior World title in Kazakhstan in July 2011.

At the Olympic qualifier in Canberra 2012 he had a tough final against New Zealander David Light but prevailed 15:10.

In 2012, Opetaia got the bronze medal at the AIBA World Youth Championships in the heavyweight division. Later that year, Opetaia competed at the 2012 Olympics, however did not pass the first round of the tournament.

Professional career

Early career
Opetaia was scheduled to face Daniel Ammann for the vacant WBC-OPBF and Australian cruiserweight titles on July 15, 2017. He won the fight by a ninth-round technical knockout. Opetaia was next scheduled to face Frankie Lopez for the vacant IBF Youth cruiserweight title on October 21, 2017. He won the fight by a first-round technical knockout.

Opetaia made his first Australian Cruiserweight title defense against Benjamin Kelleher on January 17, 2018. He won the fight by a third-round technical knockout. Opetaia fought for yet another regional title on April 7, 2018, when he was set to face Lukas Paszkowsky for the vacant WBO Asia-Pacific cruiserweight title. He won the fight by a second-round technical knockout. Opetaia made his first WBO Asia-Pacific cruiserweight title defense against Kurtis Pegoraro on June 29, 2018. The fight was simultaneously a fight for the vacant IBF Pan-Pacific cruiserweight title. He won the fight by a second-round knockout.

Opetaia fought Navosa Ioata for the vacant WBA Oceania interim cruiserweight title on May 15, 2019, and won the fight by an eight-round technical knockout. Opetaia made his first title defense two months later, on July 27, 2019, against Nikolas Charalampous, while also fighting for the vacant WBO Global cruiserweight title. He won the fight by unanimous decision. Opetaia made the first defense of these two titles, and fought for the inaugural IBF Asia-Oceania cruiserweight title, against Mark Flanagan on November 16, 2019. He won the fight by an eight-round technical knockout.

Opetaia was scheduled to defend his IBF Asia-Oceania and WBO Global cruiserweight titles in a rematch with Benjamin Kelleher on October 22, 2020. He won the fight by a sixth-round technical knockout.

IBF cruiserweight champion

Opetaia vs. Briedis
Opetaia was scheduled to challenge the reigning IBF and The Ring cruiserweight champion Mairis Briedis on 6 April 2022. The bout was postponed on February 16, as Briedis tested positive for COVID-19. The bout was rescheduled for 11 May, and was expected to take place at the Gold Coast Convention and Exhibition Centre in Broadbeach, Queensland, Australia. The bout was once again postponed on April 8, as Opetaia suffered a rib injury, and rescheduled for July 2. Opetaia won the fight by unanimous decision, with scores of 116–112, 116–112 and 115–113. During the fight, Opetaia badly broke his jaw in two places. Unable to give an interview following the match, he was instead taken directly to the hospital to undergo surgery to repair the fractures.

Professional boxing record

References 

1995 births
Australian sportspeople of Samoan descent
Boxers from Sydney
Heavyweight boxers
Boxers at the 2012 Summer Olympics
Olympic boxers of Australia
Boxers at the 2014 Commonwealth Games
Commonwealth Games competitors for Australia
Australian male boxers
Living people